National Highway 702B, commonly called NH 702B is a national highway of India. It is entirely located in the state of Nagaland in India. NH-702B is a branch of National Highway 702.

Route 
From Longleng to Tuensang.

Junctions  

Junction with National Highway 702 near Longleng.

Junction with National Highway 202 near Tuensang.

See also 
List of National Highways in India by highway number

References 

National highways in India
National Highways in Nagaland